The 69th Carlos Palanca Memorial Awards for Literature was held on November 8, 2019, at the Peninsula Hotel Manila in Makati. Fifty-six writers, 32 of whom won the award for the first time, received the prestigious literary award. There were a total of 22 writing categories, with the bi-annual Novel and Novela categories open for this year. All the entries were evaluated by literary personalities from various fields.

Decorated screenplay writer and author Lamberto E. Antonio was named a Palanca Awards Hall of Famer, receiving a first prize award for the fifth time. Also, the ceremonies saw the posthumous awarding of Milagros Palanca-Furer, the proponent of the Carlos Palanca Memorial Awards for Literature. She was instrumental in helping spur creative writing in the country and is being rightfully recognized for her unwavering dedication to the interest of the Filipino writer.

List of winners

Kabataan division

Kabataan sanaysay
 First prize: Echo Mula Sa Gatilyo by Marielle M. Calicdan
 Second prize: Sa Pilang Salungat sa Manghuhula at Bolang Kristal by Mark Andy Pedere
 Third prize: Noon Akto-o He’n Fa Gali Em (May Katotohanan pa pala) by Adrian Pete Medina Pregonir

Kabataan essay
 First prize: Thoughts on Eden by Enrico Miguel Pe Aguirre Perez
 Second prize: Before You Click by Criscela Ysabelle A. Racelis
 Third prize: The Naught of What-is, What-ifs, and Whats-not by Ann Jeline R. Pablo

Filipino division

Maikling Kwento
 First prize: Si Etot by Eros S. Atalia
 Second prize: Dahil Wala Kaming Tubig by Benjamin Joshua L. Gutierrez
 Third prize: Hilaw at Luto sa Bangkete ni Kapitan Gimo by Allan Alberto N. Derain

Maikling Kwentong Pambata
 First prize: Maselan ang Tanong ng Batang si Usman by Luis P. Gatmaitan, M.D.
 Second prize: Ako ang Kuya by Victoria Estrella C. Bravo
 Third prize: Anak ng Tinapay by Jacqueline V. Franquelli

Sanaysay
 First prize: Form & Content: Sandata sa Panahon ng Disimpormasyon at War on Drugs by Marianne Mixkaela Z. Villalon
 Second prize: Sumasaiyo by Wilfredo O. Pascual Jr.
 Third prize: Wala sa Langit si Hesus by Reson A. Gregorio

Tula
 First prize: Turno Kung Nokturno at iba pang Tiyempo ng Rilyebo sa Pagberso by Marianne Mixkaela Z. Villalon
 Second prize: Ang Wika ng Dagat ay Layo by Ralph Fonte
 Third prize: Yaong Hindi Maaaring Hawakan nang Buo by Allan John Andres

Tula Para sa mga Bata
 First prize: (no winner)
 Second prize: Ganito sa Pabrika by John Romeo L. Venturero
 Third prize: Ang Totoo Raya, ang Ulan ay Luha ng Bituin by German Villanueva Gervacio

Dulang may Isang Yugto
 First prize: (no winner)
 Second prize: Beach House by Chona M. Fernando
 Third prize: Transient Lovers by 	Bridgette Ann M. Rebuca

Dulang Ganap ang Haba
 First prize: Ang Duyan ng Magiting by Dustin Edward D. Celestino
 Second prize: Ang Huling Mambabatok by Mario L. Mendez, Jr.
 Third prize: Junix at Maricel by Bonifacio P. Ilagan

Dulang Pampelikula
 First prize: Teatro Pacifico by Mary Honeylyn Joy E. Alipio
 Second prize: Angkas by Jaymar Santos Castro
 Third prize: Nana Rosa by Rodolfo C. Vera

Regional division

Short story – Cebuano
 First prize: Binignit by Roehl Joseph A. Dazo
 Second prize: Ang Haya ni Tasyo by Januar E. Yap
 Third prize: Armas by Jondy M. Arpilleda

Short story – Hiligaynon
 First prize: Si Ena sa Kasisidmon by Alice Tan Gonzales
 Second prize: Pakutkot by Ritchie D. Pagunsan
 Third prize: Ang mga Retrato sang Dalaga by Anthony B. Capirayan

Short story – Ilokano
 First prize: El Quinto by Edison B. Tobias
 Second prize: Ti Kayo by Daniel L. Nesperos
 Third prize: Naisangsangayan a Sangaili by Remedios S. Tabelisma-Aguillon

English division

Short story
 First prize: James Machine by Kathleen Osias
 Second prize: Death for Serafina by Rayjinar Anne Marie de Guia Salcedo
 Third prize: Neon Blindness by Adrian Carl M. Pescador

Short story for children
 First prize: Pretty Peach and The Color-Matching Kaleidoscope by Juanita Roxas Singer
 Second prize: Hair by Victoria Estrella C. Bravo
 Third prize: The Accidental Adventure of Bubalus Bubalis by Daisy Ruth Oñate Sohne

Essay
 First prize: The Age of the Missing by Jocelyn G. Nicolas
 Second prize: Ashfall by Josephine V. Roque
 Third prize: Call Me A Book “Editor,” I Dare You by Michaela Sarah De Leon

Poetry
 First prize: Notes from the Field by Regine Miren D. Cabato
 Second prize: Pentimento by Rodrigo V. Dela Peña Jr.
 Third prize: Departures by Alvin Dela Serna Lopez

Poetry written for children
 First prize: (no winner)
 Second prize: (no winner)
 Third prize: What Magical Fur is This? And Other Poems by Mia A. Buenaventura

One-act play
 First prize: Dolorosa by Peter Zaragoza Mayshle
 Second prize: Daddy Complex by Adrian Carl M. Pescador
 Third prize: The Root of all Magic by Maria Amparo Nolasco Warren

Full-length play
 First prize: Changelings by Justin Michael A. Naniong
 Second prize: Mercy Country by Rolando S. Salvaña
 Third prize: Theoria Republica by Lito Casaje

Novel
 Grand prize: The Betrayed by Reine Arcache Melvin

Nobela
 Grand prize: Agaw-anino by Jerking Guzman Pingol

References

External links 
Carlos Palanca Memorial Awards for Literature

2019
Palanca